Mapanuepe Lake is a freshwater lake located in the province of Zambales in the Philippines. The lake was created after the cataclysmic eruption of Mount Pinatubo in 1991. Lahars following the eruption blocked the drainage of Mapanuepe River, south of the volcano, flooding Mapanuepe Valley together with its settlements. Only the steeple of the church protruding out of the water remained from one of the villages.

History
Mapanuepe lake is located at the confluence of Marella and Mapanuepe Rivers as the two rivers merge to become the Santo Tomas River. The subsequent rains following the 1991 eruption of Mount Pinatubo produced lahar that dumped volcanic debris on the Marella River, one of the major drainages of the mountain, aggrading the river that eventually dammed the Mapanuepe River. The rising waters submerged the Mapanuepe Valley including the barangays of Aglao (lower), Buhawen and Pili of San Marcelino, Zambales. During the development of the lake, breaching and reforming of the debris dam occurred following each lahar episode. The only structure that remains is a church tower with a huge metal cross right in the middle of the lake. Prior to the 1991 eruption, studies of geologic formations and sediments of Mapanuepe Valley showed that the area was the site of a similar lahar-formed lake from old eruptions.

Water quality
The lake water is reportedly contaminated with mercury leaking from the abandoned Dizon Copper Mine which is located on the east shore of the lake. However harmful chemicals are now diluted and the lake is believed to be safe for diving and fishing.

Popular culture
The lake was featured on Episode 10 in the second season of Destination Truth, an American TV show on the Sci-Fi Channel, titled Ahool and Pinatubo Monsters . The Destination Truth team made an investigation following reports by local fishermen of mysterious, giant, and black fish-like creatures swimming on the lake labeled as the "Pinatubo Monster" by the show.

See also
 Lakes in the Philippines

References

External links
 Mapanuepe Lake at OpenStreetMap

Lakes of the Philippines
Landforms of Zambales